Chaetostoma branickii is a species of catfish in the family Loricariidae. It is native to South America, where it occurs in the Chamaya River basin, which is part of the Marañón River drainage in Peru. The species reaches 13.2 cm (5.2 inches) SL.

References 

branickii
Fish described in 1881